The 2016–17 FSV Zwickau season was their first season in the 3. Liga, the third tier of German football.

Events
FSV Zwickau won promotion after beating SV Elversberg in the 2015–16 Regionalliga promotion play-offs.

Transfers

In

Out

Friendly matches

Competitions

3. Liga

League table

Matches

DFB-Pokal

Saxony Cup

Player information
.

|}

Notes

References

FSV Zwickau seasons
Zwickau